is a Japanese football player for Vanraure Hachinohe.

Career
After attending Toyo University, Koike joined Blaublitz Akita in January 2019.

Club statistics
Updated to 15 December 2021.

Honours
 Blaublitz Akita
 J3 League (1): 2020

References

External links

Profile at J. League
Profile at Akita

1996 births
Living people
Toyo University alumni
Association football people from Chiba Prefecture
Japanese footballers
J3 League players
YSCC Yokohama players
Blaublitz Akita players
Association football goalkeepers